Dower & Hall is a British Jewellery brand that was established in 1990 by husband and wife team Dan Dower & Diane Hall. The brand has a store in Glasgow and is also stocked by independents and department stores, such as John Lewis and Fenwick, around the country.

History 
Dower & Hall was founded with the aid of a Prince's Trust business loan. The brand’s initial success soon led to their first store opening in 1995, in Knightsbridge. Followed by their Glasgow store in 2004. The brand now has over 100 stockists nationwide. They also provide an online shopping experience which ships worldwide.

Products 
Dower & Hall makes a wide variety of sustainable jewellery in their London based workshop, from sterling silver and gold vermeil to 18ct gold, platinum and luxury bespoke designs. Dower & Hall are proud to use recycled metal in all their sterling silver and solid gold jewellery, resulting in accessible luxury jewellery that is both affordable and ethical.

Celebrity and press 
Dower & Hall has been seen on Millie Mackintosh, Amanda Holden, Little Mix, Joss Stone and Katherine Jenkins, among others and on the pages of fashion magazines, including You & Your Wedding, Stylist and Cosmopolitan. Their most notable appearance was in the James Bond film ‘Skyfall’, where their pearl designs were worn by Dame Judi Dench in her role as M.

References

British jewellery designers
1990 establishments in the United Kingdom